Augusto Midana (born 20 May 1984 in Sucuto-Nhacra) is a freestyle wrestler from Guinea-Bissau who competes in the men's middleweight (-74 kg) category. He represented Guinea-Bissau in the 2008 Summer Olympics in Beijing, China, and was the flagbearer for his nation during the opening ceremonies of those games.  He competed again at the 2012 Summer Olympics, finishing in 7th place.

He once again competed for Guinea-Bissau at the 2016 Summer Olympics in Rio de Janeiro. He was defeated by Jordan Burroughs of the United States in the first round. He was the flagbearer for Guinea-Bissau during the Parade of Nations. He qualified at the 2021 African & Oceania Wrestling Olympic Qualification Tournament to represent Guinea-Bissau at the 2020 Summer Olympics in Tokyo, Japan.

Midana is six-time African champion at the men's middleweight (–74 kg) category.

Major results

References

 Augusto Midana's profile at NBC

External links
 

1984 births
Living people
Bissau-Guinean male sport wrestlers
Wrestlers at the 2008 Summer Olympics
Wrestlers at the 2012 Summer Olympics
Wrestlers at the 2016 Summer Olympics
Olympic wrestlers of Guinea-Bissau
Competitors at the 2007 All-Africa Games
Competitors at the 2019 African Games
African Games medalists in wrestling
African Games bronze medalists for Guinea-Bissau
African Wrestling Championships medalists
Wrestlers at the 2020 Summer Olympics